Feel Free: Essays is a 2018 book of essays by Zadie Smith. It was published on 8 February 2018 by Hamish Hamilton, an imprint of Penguin Books. It has been described as "thoroughly resplendent" by Maria Popova, who writes: "Smith applies her formidable mind in language to subjects as varied as music, the connection between dancing and writing, climate change, Brexit, the nature of joy, and the confusions of personhood in the age of social media."

Smith borrowed the title from Nick Laird, her husband, who has also published a collection of poems by the same name.

Awards and honours
2018 National Book Critics Circle Award (criticism), winner

References

Further reading

External links 

 

2018 non-fiction books
English essay collections
English-language books
Hamish Hamilton books
Essay collections by Zadie Smith
National Book Critics Circle Award-winning works